Brave Enough is a 2016 album by Lindsey Stirling.

Brave Enough may also refer to:  

 Brave Enough: Live at the Variety Playhouse, a 2013 album by Sara Bareilles
 Brave Enough, a 2016 album by Surinamese singer/songwriter Jeangu Macrooy
 Brave Enough, a 2015 book by Cheryl Strayed  
 Brave Enough, a 2020 book by Jessie Diggins and Todd Smith